The Statistics Commission was a non-departmental public body established in June 2000 by the UK Government to oversee the work of the Office for National Statistics.
 Its chairman was Professor David Rhind who succeeded the first chairman, Sir John Kingman, in May 2003. Although it was non-departmental, the commission was funded by grant-in-aid from the Treasury. Following the implementation of the Statistics & Registration Services Act 2007, the commission was abolished. Its functions were to be taken over and considerably enhanced by the UK Statistics Authority (UKSA), whose powers began on 1 April 2008 under the chairmanship of Sir Michael Scholar. Professor Rhind is among the non-executive members of the new authority, to which the ONS is accountable. This contrasts with the duties of the previous Commission which were limited to reporting, observing and criticizing ONS while it, until 2008, has been publicly accountable via a Treasury minister.

History
The Commission arose from an election manifesto commitment by the Labour Government whilst in Opposition to provide independent national statistics. The commitment was implemented by the Government first publishing a Green Paper in 1998 inviting consultation which offered four options for overseeing the production of statistics for ministers. The subsequent white paper revealed that, of those four options, the one which received significantly more support than the others was the establishment of a Commission Consequently, in drawing up the new framework for national statistics, the Statistics Commission was established. Its main function is to
"...give independent, reliable and relevant advice on National Statistics to Ministers and, by so doing, to provide an additional safeguard on the quality and integrity of National Statistics."
The white paper charged the commission with four principal aims:
To consider and comment to government on National Statistics's programme and scope of work
To comment on National Statistics's quality assurance processes and to arrange audits where it finds concern
To comment on the application of the code of practice for official statistics
To prepare for the UK Parliament an annual report on National Statistics and the Commission

Commissioners
The last commissioners were:
Professor David Rhind, formerly Vice-Chancellor and President of City University, London
Ian Beesley, a retired senior partner at PricewaterhouseCoopers and Fellow of the Royal Statistical Society
Sir Kenneth Calman, Vice-Chancellor and Warden of the University of Durham
Janet Trewsdale, chairman of the Northern Ireland Economic Council
Sir Derek Wanless, formerly a director of Northern Rock plc
Colette Bowe, chairman of the Ofcom Consumer Panel
Patricia Hodgson, governor of the Wellcome Foundation and non-executive director of the Competition Commission
Martin Weale, director of the National Institute of Economic and Social Research
Joly Dixon, a retired director at the European Commission and Fellow of the Royal Statistical Society

The chief executive was Richard Alldritt

See also
Office for National Statistics
UK Statistics Authority (UKSA)
HM Treasury

References

"Framework for National Statistics", First Edition, Operational from June 2000
H.M. Treasury press release announcing outcome of White Paper and creation of the Commission.
List of Statistics Commissioners.
Frequently-asked-questions on the Commission's website

Treasury announcement of the Framework document.

External links
 The Statistics Commission's website
 The Office for National Statistics' website

Defunct non-departmental public bodies of the United Kingdom government
Office for National Statistics
2000 establishments in the United Kingdom